Serena (died 409) was a Theodosian imperial woman, niece of Theodosius I. 

In 384, Theodosius arranged her marriage to a rising military officer, Stilicho. Stilicho's marriage to Serena ensured his loyalty to the House of Theodosius in the years ahead.

A resident at the court of her cousin, Honorius, she selected a bride for the court poet, Claudian, and took care of Honorius' half-sister, her cousin Galla Placidia. She and Stilicho had a son, Eucherius, and two daughters, Maria and Thermantia, successively the first and second wives of Honorius.

According to the pagan historian Zosimus, Serena took a necklace from a statue of Rhea Silvia and placed it on her own neck. However, this was later dismissed; Serena was not a pagan and did not associate with them. 

Stilicho was executed on Honorius' orders in 408. During the siege of Rome by the Visigoths the following year, Serena was falsely accused of conspiring with the Goths, and was executed with Galla Placidia's consent.

Notes

Bibliography 

Santo Mazzarino. Serena e le due Eudossie. Roma, Istituto Nazionale di Studi Romani, 1946 

409 deaths
4th-century Christians
5th-century Christians
Executed ancient Roman women
5th-century Roman women
Theodosian dynasty
Romans from Hispania
5th-century executions
Year of birth unknown
4th-century births
People executed by the Roman Empire
Executed ancient Roman people
Romans from unknown gentes
4th-century Roman women